The Protestant School Board of Greater Montreal (PSBGM, CEPGM) was a Protestant and predominantly English-language school district in Montreal, Quebec, Canada

which was founded in 1951 as a replacement for the Montreal Protestant Central Board, and ceased operations in 1998, with most of its assets transferred to the new English Montreal School Board. Quebec's Protestant school boards served all non-Catholics, so that the city's Jewish students generally attended schools operated by the PSBGM.

The PSBGM's headquarters was located at 6000 Fielding Avenue in Montreal, which is now the headquarters for the English Montreal School Board.

Schools operated
This partial list includes some schools that are still in operation and others that have closed or been put to other uses.

Elementary schools

 Ecole Peace Centenial

Aberdeen - across from Carré St. Louis
Alexandria School - Sanguinet below Ste Catherine.
Alfred Joyce Elementary School
École Ahuntsic
Algonquin
Amherst School - Belanger/Chabot area
Bancroft School
Earl Grey - Bellechasse/Christophe colombe
Barclay School
Bedford
Beechwood School
Berthelet School - Ontario west
Crawford Park School
Carlyle School
Cecil Newman School
Cedarcrest School
Connaught School - Ville Emard
Coronation School
Cote-des-Neiges
Courtland Park School
École Crawford Park
Dalkeith School in Anjou
Drummond School - 13th avenue Rosemont.1931-1970
Dunrae Gardens School
École Dupuis
Edinburgh School
Edouard VII 
Elizabeth Ballantyne School
F.A.C.E. I & II
École de la Fraternité
Gardenview School
Gilson School - NDG
Delormier - Gilford and Chabot
Devonshire 
Dufferin School
École Glencoe
École du Grand Chêne
Guy Drummond
Hampstead School
Herbert Purcell School
École Iona
Keith School
École Laurentide
École Louisbourg
École Maisonneuve
Hochelaga School on Prefontaine.
John Jenkins - Mercier district.
Lansdowne School 
Logan School
Lorne School
McLaren School - Notre Dame Street East
MacVicar - on Hochelaga St.
Meadowbrook School
Merton School
École Montrose
Morison School
Nesbitt School in Rosemont
East Hill (formerly Nesbitt School Annex)
École Ogilvie
Parkdale School
École Perce-Neige
École des Rapides de Lachine
Riverview School
École Riviére des Prairies
Roslyn School
Roxboro Elementary School
Royal Vale School
Russell School (TMR)
Sarah Maxwell on Prefontaine
Sinclair Laird School
Sir Arthur Currie School - Rosedale Ave
Somerled School
Strathearn School - Jeanne Mance St.
École Tetreaultville
Van Horne
École Westminster
Westmount Park School
Westpark School
Willingdon School
Woodland School

Westbrook Elementary

High schools

Baron Byng High School
Malcolm Campbell High School
École secondaire Cardinal
Sir Winston Churchill High School, later merged with St. Laurent High School to become LaurenHill Academy
Connections
Académie de Roberval
École secondaire Dorval
Dunton High School The building was later used for Doran High School, then Aime Renaud High School, and now Academie Dunton
École secondaire Eureka
F.A.C.E. III & IV
Girls' High School
John Grant High School
High School of Montreal
Lachine High School
LaSalle Extended High School
École secondaire La Voie
Le Relais
M.I.N.D.
Monklands High School - NDG
Montreal West High School, later renamed Royal West Academy
École secondaire Mont-Royal, English until 1985, French thereafter
Northmount High School
Northmount Alternative High School
Options I School
Options II School
Outreach
École secondaire Outremont
Programme Mile-End
Riverdale High School
Riverside Park Academy
Rosemount High School in Rosemont
Royal Vale High School
Shadd Academy
Strathcona Academy
Sumerlea Centre
Verdun High School, later renamed Argyle Academy
Venture High School
Vezina High School
Wagar High School
Ecole secondaire Wentworth High School - English school with a French immersion component.
Westmount High School
West Hill High School
Ynova

History
The Government of Quebec reorganized the province's public school boards in the mid-1990s. School boards in Quebec had been organized along confessional lines, Catholic and Protestant, since before Canadian Confederation. In fact, Quebec was guaranteed a confessional public school system by the British North America Act, 1867, now known as the Constitution Act, 1867. The provincial government was therefore required to ask the federal government to amend the Canadian Constitution if it were to reorganize school boards along linguistic lines, English and French. The amendment was passed without much debate by both the House of Commons and the Senate, notwithstanding the unresolved constitutional debate between Quebec and the rest of Canada.

The PSBGM held the 1996 PSBGM 150th Anniversary Logo Contest. Debra Shapiro-Lambersky, then a 6th grade student at the Willingdon School, designed the winning logo, showing a group of books surrounding a red heart.

English Montreal School Board and the other new linguistic school boards began operations on July 1, 1998. The English sector of the PSBGM and the English sectors of the Montreal Catholic School Commission, the Commission scolaire Jérôme-Le Royer and the Commission scolaire Sainte-Croix were amalgamated to form the EMSB. The French-language sector became a part of the Commission scolaire de Montréal.

Labour relations
The board's teachers were represented by the Provincial Association of Protestant Teachers, a union and professional association which later merged with its English-language Catholic counterpart, the Provincial Association of Catholic Teachers, to form the Quebec Provincial Association of Teachers.

Leadership
School board members were originally appointed, but this gave way to elections, originally restricted to property-owners.

References

External links

 (Archive) 
"Création du Bureau métropolitain des écoles protestantes de Montréal." Université de Sherbrooke 

Education in Montreal
Historical school districts in Quebec
English-language education in Quebec
Protestantism in Canada
Quebec Anglophone culture in Montreal